As of January 2023, the Colombo Stock Exchange (CSE) has 290 listings.

A

B

C

D

E

F

G

H

I

J

K

L

M

N

O

P

R

S

T

U

V

W

Y

References

 
Colombo Stock Exchange
Colombo Stock Exchange